Richmond Hill is a hill in Galle, the capital of southern Sri Lanka. The hill is located in the village of Kumbalwella. Situated on the hill is  Richmond College, a primary and secondary school for boys, which is the first Methodist school in Asia.

History

The original  land parcel was purchased in 1839 by Dr. Robert Seymour Croxton Sillery, M.D., who established a farm and a coconut estate on the property. At the time the land was known as Mount Seymour or Sillery's Hill. In 1857 Rev. Joseph Rippon, the head of the Methodist missionaries in Galle persuaded the Wesleyan Methodist Missionary Trust Association in England to purchase the land, for Rs. 937/50, with a view to establishing an industrial school, a school for boys and girls and a theological institution on the site. Rippon had his theological training at Richmond College in Surrey and either out of love for his former college or because of the scenic splendour of the local counterpart, renamed the location Richmond Hill. Rippon's successor, Rev. George Baugh, renamed the Richmond Hill Girls' Boarding school as Whitefield Road Girls' School, in 1871 (which was renamed the Girls' high School in 1876) and upgraded the Galle School to a collegiate school in 1876, and named it the Galle High School, in 1876 (which was renamed Richmond College in 1882 on a suggestion made by Rev Samuel Hill who was the Principal).

Richmond Hill Railway Station

The Richmond Hill railway station is the first railway station in Sri Lanka built and named after a school. The Richmond Hill Station is located on the Coastal line between the Piyadigama railway station and Galle Railway Station. It was constructed during the early 1900s for the benefit of children who attend the many schools around the area.

References

Galle
Hills of Sri Lanka
Landforms of Galle District